The Volunteer (1944) is a short black-and-white British film by the filmmakers Michael Powell and Emeric Pressburger for the U.K. Ministry of Information. Made during World War II as recruitment propaganda for the Fleet Air Arm, volunteer numbers rose after its release.

The films features actor Ralph Richardson starring in a West End production of Othello. Pat McGrath plays his dresser, who joins the Fleet Air Arm and becomes a war hero – as famous as Richardson himself. British film stars Anna Neagle and Laurence Olivier make cameo appearances, as does director Michael Powell and fellow British film director Anthony Asquith.

The film is available as a supplement to the Criterion DVD of 49th Parallel.

External links
 The Volunteer reviews and articles at the Powell & Pressburger Pages
 
 

1944 films
1940s English-language films
British aviation films
British World War II propaganda shorts
Films shot at Denham Film Studios
British black-and-white films
Films by Powell and Pressburger
1944 war films
British war films